The Gardner Swamp Wildlife Area is a  tract of protected land located in Door County, Wisconsin, managed by the Wisconsin Department of Natural Resources. Land to be used for the Wildlife Area was first acquired in 1958, and the master plan for the Wildlife Area was completed in 1980.

Gardner Swamp
The swamp for which the Wildlife Area is named after has several different types of land covering it.

Flora and Fauna
The above-mentioned river, Keyes Creek, in addition to bisecting the Wildlife Area, is also classified as a Class II Trout Stream, and is used as a spawning ground for Northern pike and White sucker. In addition to varied species of fish that can be found in Keyes Creek, the Wildlife Area is home to various waterfowl, deer, beaver, woodcock, shorebirds, and the occasional bald eagle.

The Wildlife Area is also home to the critically endangered Hine's emerald dragonfly.

See also
 Hine's emerald dragonfly
 Sturgeon Bay
 Swamp

References

External Links
 U.S. Geological Survey Map at the U.S. Geological Survey Map Website. Retrieved February 28th, 2022.
 Biodiversity in Selected Natural Communities Related to Global Climate Change Report at the Focus Energy Website. Retrieved March 1st, 2022.

State Wildlife Area
Protected areas of Door County, Wisconsin
Protected areas established in 1980